Yevgeny Andreyevich Berens (occasionally transliterated as Behrens;  – 7 April 1928) was a Russian military leader, Commander-in-Chief of the Soviet Naval Forces from April 1919 to February 1920.

Born in Tiflis in 1876, Berens graduated from the Naval Cadet Corps in 1895. He was navigating officer of the Russian cruiser Varyag and fought in the Battle of Chemulpo Bay when his ship was sunk. After being repatriated he served in the Baltic Fleet as executive officer of the Russian battleship Tsesarevich. From 1910 to 1917 he served as naval attache to the Netherlands, Germany, and Italy (1915–1917).  After the February Revolution, Berens returned to Russia and served on the Naval General Staff.

After the October Revolution he joined the Red side and was head of the Naval Staff from 1917 to 1919. In 1919, he was appointed commander of the Soviet Navy on the death of Vasili Altfater.

In 1920, he was transferred to the diplomatic service and was head of the Soviet delegation at major conferences. He was military attache to Great Britain and France from 1924. He died in Moscow in 1928 and was buried in Novodevichy Cemetery.

Berens' brother, Mikhail Berens, was also a naval officer but joined the white side in the Russian Civil War and commanded Wrangel's fleet

Sources 

 This article is translated from Russian Wikipedia

1876 births
1928 deaths
Military personnel from Tbilisi
People from Tiflis Governorate
Imperial Russian Navy admirals
Russian military leaders
Russian military personnel of the Russo-Japanese War
Russian military personnel of World War I
Soviet admirals
Recipients of the Order of Saint Stanislaus (Russian)
Burials at Novodevichy Cemetery
Soviet military attachés
Naval Cadet Corps alumni